Downtown West is a neighborhood comprising a southwestern portion of downtown Baltimore, Maryland.

References

Neighborhoods in Baltimore